Chemokine (C-C motif) ligand 7 (CCL7) is a small cytokine that was previously called monocyte-chemotactic protein 3 (MCP3). CCL7 is a small protein that belongs to the CC chemokine family and is most closely related to CCL2 (previously called MCP1).

Genomics 
In the human genome, CCL7 is encoded by the CCL7 gene which is one of the several chemokine genes clustered on chromosome 17q11.2-q12. This region contains the gene for the MCP subset of CC chemokines. The CCL7 gene has been given the locus symbol SCYA7.

The gene consists of three exons and two introns. The first exon contains a 5′-untranslated region (5′-UTR), the information for the signal sequence (23 amino acids), and the mature protein's first two amino acids. The second exon encodes amino acids 3–42 of the mature proteins. The third exon is composed of the C-terminal region of the protein, a 3′-UTR containing one or more destabilizing AU-rich sequences and a polyadenylation signal.

Molecular biology 
CCL7 was first characterized from osteosarcoma supernatant. CCL7 consists of 99 amino acids, which contains 23-amino acid signal peptide. The mature protein about 76 amino acids is secreted after cleavage of the signal peptide. In contrast to most chemokines, CCL7 exists in a general monomeric form, differing from the dimer formed in a highly concentrated solution.

CCL7 can exist in four different glycotypes with a molecular weight 11, 13, 17 and 18 kDa in COS cells.  

CCL7 mediates effects on the immune cell types through binding to numerous receptors, including CCR1, CCR2, CCR3, CCR5, and CCR10. These receptors belongs to the G protein-coupled seven-transmembrane receptors. CCL7 can also interact with cell surface glycosaminoglycans (GAGs) present on all animal cell surfaces.

Function 
CCL7 is expressed in many types of cells, including stromal cells, keratinocytes, airway smooth muscle cells, parenchymal cells, fibroblasts and leukocytes and also in tumor cells.   

CCL7 mainly acts as a chemoattractant for several leukocytes, including monocytes, eosinophils, basophils, dendritic cells (DCs), neutrophils, NK cells and activated T lymphocytes. Thus, chemotactic factor CCL7 recruits  leukocytes to infected tissues to mediate the immune response. Furthermore, CCL7 has an influence to diapedesis and extravasation of leukocytes. The positive effect of CCL7 is mainly observed in monocyte mobilization from bone marrow to blood circulation and in the recruitment of monocytes to sites of inflammation. It was also reported, that CCL7 can also induce neutrophil migration to the inflammatory site by increasing intracellular Ca2+ flux, which is more typical for the CXC chemokine family members.

The speed of immune responses varies depending on the type of the cells. In epithelial cells, fibroblasts, and endothelial cells the response is immediate after the stimulation by proinflammatory cytokines as IL-1β and TNFα. In T lymphocytes the expression of CCL7 occurs after 3-5 days after the stimulation. 

CCL7 has been shown to interact with MMP2 by binding CCR2 receptor.

Clinical importance 
CCL7 is a multipotent chemokine involved in anti-bacterial, anti-viral and anti-fungal immune responses. For example, CCL7-mediated stimulation of CCR2 chemokine receptors on monocytes is participating in the elimination of Listeria monocytogenes infections by the recruitment of monocytes and TNF/iNOS-producing dendritic cells (TipDCs). Next, the role of the CCL7 was also observed in the mouse infected by West Nile Virus. The genetically deficient mice in CCL7 have increased mortality because of decrease in monocytes and neutrophils. Early induction of CCL7 downstream of TLR9 signaling also promotes the development of robust immunity to cryptococcal infections.

Diseases associated with CCL7 dysregulation are observed. For example, an abnormal increase of CCL7 worsens many disorders, like HIV or lesional psoriasis. Furthermore, CCL7 is implicated in various immunological diseases, as ulcerative colitis, multiple sclerosis or nonatopic and atopic asthma. 

It seems, that the expression of CCL7 can activate an antitumor immune response.

References

Further reading

External links 
 

Signal transduction
Cytokines